Lift Every Voice and Sing, also known as The Harp, was a plaster sculpture by African-American artist Augusta Savage.  It was commissioned for the 1939 New York World's Fair, and displayed in the courtyard of the Pavilion of Contemporary Art during the fair at Flushing Meadow.  The sculpture was destroyed along with other temporary artworks at the site after the closing of the exhibition in 1940.

Background
Augusta Fells was born in 1892 in Green Cove Springs, Florida, about 40 miles south of Jacksonville, Florida.  She married John T. Moore in 1907, at the age of 15, and had her only child the following year, a daughter Irene.  After Moore's death, she married James Savage in 1915.  She divorced her second husband in 1920 but retained his surname for the rest of her life.  She moved to study in New York in 1921, with a letter of introduction to Solon Borglum.  She could not afford the fees at his American School of Sculpture and instead studied at Cooper Union, completing a four-year degree in three years due to her experience.  She married her third husband Robert Lincoln Poston in 1923, but he died the following year on his return journey after leading a delegation to Liberia.

Also in 1923, Savage won a full scholarship to attend the inaugural artistic summer school at Fontainebleau, in France near Paris, but the scholarship was withdrawn by the selection committee on account of her color – reportedly because white American students from Georgia would not share rooms with an African-American.  W. E. B. Du Bois wrote letters supporting her application, and the rejection was reported in a number of newspapers.  One member of the selection committee, the sculptor Hermon A. MacNeil, disagreed with the withdrawal of the scholarship, and offered Savage the opportunity to study with him instead.  She continued to work in the US, and eventually gathered sufficient funding to study in France at the Académie de la Grande Chaumière  from 1929, exhibiting at the Salon d'Automne in 1930, and at the Salon de Printemps and the Paris Colonial Exposition in 1931.

She returned to the US to open the Savage Studio of Arts and Crafts in New York City in 1932, with a grant from the Carnegie Foundation.  In 1934, she was the first African-American to be elected to the National Association of Women Artists, and in 1937, she was appointed as the first director of the Harlem Community Art Center.

Also in 1937, she was the only African-American woman commissioned by the Board of Design to create a sculpture for the 1939 World's Fair.  One male African-American sculptor was also commissioned, William Grant Still, and at least four other women, including Elfriede Abbe, Malvina Hoffman, Brenda Putnam and Gertrude Vanderbilt Whitney.  Savage was one of 14 women awarded a silver medal by the Women's Service League of Brooklyn for their artistic contribution to the fair.

Savage took leave of absence from the Harlem Community Art Center to focus on the sculpture, but when she returned she found her job had been taken by another person, Gwendolyn Bennett.  Savage exhibited at the American Negro Exposition in 1940, and founded two commercial galleries which failed. Her sculpture for the World's Fair was her last major work.  She moved to Saugerties, New York in 1945, where she became an art teacher and farmer.  She died in New York City in 1962.

Description
Savage was asked to make a sculpture to symbolize African-American music for the 1939 World's Fair.  The sculpture was inspired by the poem "Lift Every Voice and Sing" written in 1900 by James Weldon Johnson.  Set to music as a hymn in 1905 by his brother John Rosamond Johnson, it became known as the "Negro national anthem".  A photograph of a preliminary sketch appeared on the cover of the NAACP magazine The Crisis in April 1939.

In front of the harp, the figure of a bare-chested black man was kneeling, holding sheet music for the song. The plaster was given a dark surface treatment, and finished like basalt.

Savage named the sculpture Lift Every Voice and Sing after the poem and hymn, but the fair's organizing committee renamed it The Harp.  Exhibited outside the redwood-clad Pavilion of Contemporary Art, it became very popular at the fair, and many postcards and  metal replicas were sold as souvenirs.  There was no funding available to remove and store the plaster sculpture at the end of the fair, or to cast the large piece in bronze as Savage had with other smaller works.  The sculpture was destroyed along with other temporary works when the exhibition closed after its second season in 1940.

Replicas 
Examples of the metal replicas are held in several museums, including the Schomburg Center in Harlem, and the Columbus Museum in Georgia.  A gold plated example was sold at Bonham's in Los Angeles in 2018 for US$9,375 (including buyer's premium).  A silver example was sold at Swann Galleries in 2019 for $21,250.

A photograph of a replica of the sculpture was chosen for the cover of the 2021 work Women's International Thought: Towards a New Canon.

References

 "As Confederate Statues Fall, What Should Replace Them?", Aviva Kempner, New York Times, November 29, 2017
 Babylon’s Harps, Steven M. Allen
 Lift Every Voice and Sing (The Harp), Columbus Museum
 Augusta Savage, Lift Every Voice and Sing, Bonham's, 25 October 2018
 "Lift Every Voice and Sing", New York Public Library (archived)
 Augusta Savage, Lift Every Voice And Sing, 1939, Conner Rosenkrantz
 Augusta Savage, Lift Every Voice and Sing (The Harp), Swann Auction Galleries, October 8, 2019
 Augusta Savage, Shades of Noir, July 9, 2020
 Remembering Augusta Savage, The Only Black Woman Commissioned To Create Art For The 1939 World's Fair, gothamist, December 22, 2020 
 Creating Their Own Image: The History of African-American Women Artists, Lisa E. Farrington, p. 101-107
 The Crisis, April 1939, p. 97, 102
 "Groundbreaking Held For Lift Ev’ry Voice And Park", The Jaxson, February 26, 2021
 The Other Side of Color: African American Art in the Collection of Camille O. and William H. Cosby, Jr, David C. Driskell, Pomegranate, 2001, p. 44-46, 196-197
 Women's International Thought: Towards a New Canon, Edited by Patricia Owens, Katharina Rietzler, Kimberly Hutchings, Sarah C. Dunstan, Cambridge University Press

External links
 Activist Art on a World Stage, Women & the American Story, New York Historical Society
 The Making of African American Identity: Volume III, 1917-1968, National Humanities Center 
 Sculptor Augusta Savage, usslave.blogspot.com March 9, 2012
 Shots of the Netherlands pavilion and an American Art sculpture at the New York World's Fair in the 1930s. DVarchive (footage at 23–40 seconds)
 Augusta Savage, African-American Harlem Renaissance Artist, Have I Got a Story for You 
 Augusta Savage: A Woman of Her Word, National Gallery of Art, 2019
 Augusta Savage "The Harp" 1930's African American Sculpture

1939 sculptures
1939 New York World's Fair
Destroyed sculptures
Musical instruments in art
Sculptures of African Americans
World's fair sculptures